Laurent Warlouzet (born 1978) is a French academic who is currently Professor of European History at Paris Sorbonne University.

Background
Professor Warlouzet was educated at Paris 4 University. He was appointed associate professor at the Université d'Artois and subsequently full professor at University of the Littoral, before moving to Sorbonne University in 2019. He held postdoctoral fellowships at the European University Institute in Florence and at LSE, where he taught in the MSc History of International Relations.

Work Experience
Professor Warlouzet is a specialist in the history of European integration, especially of the EEC/EU, and of European economic and social policies. In his book Governing Europe in a Globalizing World, he interpreted the history of European integration as a contest between social-oriented, neomercantilist, market-oriented and neoliberal projects, wherein competition policy played a major role in the assertion of a neoliberal Europe. In Foreign Affairs, Andrew Moravcsik offered a balanced review of the book, stating that: “Although Warlouzet is sometimes tempted to exaggerate the range of potential choices governments faced, in the end, his book proposes some clear answers”. Kiran Klaus Patel underlines that “Warlouzet has written a fascinating and highly important book that stresses the openness of developments and that the EC’s central position for Western Europe’s international economic and social policies was by no means a given”, but he comments that “there is a price for this breadth: the book focuses on the tier of top political decision-makers in the three wealthiest Western European states only”

On Brexit, during a roundtable with Piers Ludlow and Jonathan Faull, Warlouzet has emphasized the outsized influence Britain traditionally exercised over the EEC/EU during its years as a member-state

An expert on EU and French politics, he writes in Le Monde and he was quoted by the Süddeutsche Zeitung, by the Danish newspaper Information, by the Helsingin Sanomat, by Il Fatto Quotidiano and by La Libre Belgique.

Bibliography
 Warlouzet, L., Europe contre Europe. Entre liberté, solidarité et puissance, 2022 (CNRS éditions) 
 Warlouzet, L., Governing Europe in a Globalizing World: Neoliberalism and its Alternatives following the 1973 Oil Crisis, 2018 (Routledge) 
 Bussière, E. Warlouzet, L. (eds), Histoire des Provinces françaises du Nord, 1914-2014, 2016 (Artois Presses Université) 
 Chélini, M.-P., Warlouzet, L. (eds), Slowing Down Prices. European Inflation in the 1970s, 2016 (Presses de Sciences-po) 
 Warlouzet, L., Le choix de la CEE par la France. Les débats économiques de Pierre Mendès-France à Charles de Gaulle (1955-1969), 2011 (Igpde) 
 Guieu, J.-M., Le Dréau, C., Ralfik, J., Warlouzet, L., Penser et construire l’Europe, 1919-1992, 2007 (Belin sup) 
 Rücker, K., Warlouzet, L. (eds), Which Europe (s). New Approaches in European Integration History, 2006 (Peter Lang)

References 

21st-century French historians
Academic staff of Paris-Sorbonne University
1978 births
Living people